Richard Blake Curd (born September 19, 1967) is an American politician and a Republican member of the South Dakota Senate representing District 12 since June 6, 2013. Curd served non-consecutively in the South Dakota Legislature from January 2009 until January 11, 2011 in the South Dakota House of Representatives District 12 seat. He was a candidate for the United States House of Representatives for South Dakota's at-large congressional district in the 2010 election. Curd was appointed to the South Dakota Senate to fill the vacancy caused by the resignation of Republican Senator J. Mark Johnston.

Education
Curd graduated from the University of Missouri–Kansas City School of Medicine.

Elections
2010 To challenge incumbent Democratic United States House of Representatives member Stephanie Herseth Sandlin, Curd ran in the three-way June 8, 2010 Republican Primary but lost to state Representative Kristi Noem; Noem went on to win the three-way November 2, 2010 General election against U.S. Representative Sandlin and Independent candidate B. Thomas Marking.
2008 When House District 33 incumbent Republican Representative Michael Buckingham ran for South Dakota Senate and incumbent Republican Representative Don Van Etten was term limited and left the Legislature, Curd ran in the four-way June 3, 2008 Republican Primary and placed second with 747 votes (24.8%), in the four-way November 4, 2008 General election incumbent Representative Manny Steele took the first seat and Curd took the second seat with 6,119 votes (27.1%) ahead of Democratic nominees Paula Johnson and Gregory Kniffen, who had run for the seat in 2006.

References

External links
Official page at the South Dakota Legislature
 

1967 births
21st-century American politicians
Living people
Republican Party members of the South Dakota House of Representatives
People from Atlantic, Iowa
Physicians from South Dakota
Politicians from Sioux Falls, South Dakota
Republican Party South Dakota state senators
University of Missouri–Kansas City alumni